Sue Pedley (born 1954, Launceston Tasmania) is an Australian multi-media artist known for site-specific artworks in Australia and overseas. She has participated in residencies including the Bundanon Trust Creative Research Residency in 2016, the Tokyo Wonder Site in 2012, and the 2008 International Sculpture Symposium, Vietnam. Pedley works solo and in collaboration with other artists.

Early life 
Pedley grew up in Launceston, Northern Tasmania where her mother Peggy Pedley co-founded the Riverside Pottery Studio, a long-running gallery, ceramics studio and teaching hub. Members routinely worked with local clays.

Pedley initially studied Early Childhood Education, later switching to art, and graduating Bachelor of Fine Arts, from the Tasmanian School of Art in 1985. She was a guest student at Städelschule, Frankfurt, Germany. In 1997 she completed a Master of Fine Art at the Sydney College of the Arts.

Career 
Pedley held her first solo exhibition, intertidal, at Fitzroy's Gertrude Street Gallery in 1991. Then, as now, her work draws from the natural world. Her art is triggered by the shapes, textures and stories from beaches, waterways, and vegetation.

Sue and Peggy Pedley's joint Patches of Light exhibition was held at Queen Victoria Museum and Art Gallery Tasmania in 2019. The Pedley family is bound to the Tasmanian landscape "through a history of labour, trade, and artistic practice across six generations following the colonisation of Tasmania".

Pedley's art often features large-scale drawing, rubbings, or cyanotypes. Found objects, including organic mementos like seaweed, bamboo and fleece also appear in her work.

Since 1995, she has been a drawing tutor at art schools in Sydney, including the Sydney College of the Arts and the National Art School.

Selected group exhibitions 

 2021 Womanifesto Southeast Asia Biennial, Guangzhou Academy of Fine Arts
 2019 Hands Across the Pacific, curator Ian Howard, Ningbo Museum of Art, China
 2015 Future Feminist Archive, Daughters Mothers, SCA Galleries, University of Sydney
 2006 Light Sensitive, Contemporary Australian Photography, National Gallery of Victoria, Melbourne
 2006 William and Winifred Bowness Photography Prize, Monash University Gallery, Melbourne
 2006 Jacaranda Acquisitive Drawing Award, Grafton Regional Gallery
 2006 We are Australian Too, Casula Powerhouse Art Centre
 2006 Australian Photographic Portrait Prize, Art Gallery of NSW, Sydney
 2004 Tamworth Fibre Biennial, 2004, Tamworth Regional Gallery.
 2004 53rd Blake Prize, Sir Hermann Black Gallery, Sydney
 2004 National Small Sculpture Prize, Woollahra, Sydney

Collections 

 Queen Victoria Museum and Art Gallery, Launceston, Tasmania
 Artbank, Sydney, Australia
 National Gallery of Victoria, Melbourne, Australia
 University of Technology, Sydney
 Marsden Collection Campbelltown Regional Art Gallery, Australia.

Awards 

 2010 Australia Council and Australia Japan Foundation
 2009 New Works Grant, Australia Council
 2008 Walking and Art Residency, The Banff Centre, Canada
 2007 Skills and Development Grant, Australia Council
 2006 Echigo Tsumari Art Triennial
 2006, International Visual Arts Strategy, Visual Arts Board, Australia Council
 2005 New Work Grant, Visual Arts and Craft Board, Australia Council
 2001 New Work Grant, Visual Arts and Craft Board, Australia Council

References 

20th-century Australian artists
1954 births
Artists from Tasmania
Living people
21st-century Australian artists
University of Tasmania alumni
University of Sydney alumni